Vere Triechler (June 5, 1879 – April 28, 1947) was an American football coach.  He served as the head football coach at Franklin & Marshall College in Lancaster, Pennsylvania.  He held that position for the 1907 season.  His coaching record at Franklin & Marshall was 4–6.

Triechler died of a heart attack on April 28, 1947.

Head coaching record

References

1879 births
1947 deaths
Franklin & Marshall Diplomats football coaches
People from Elizabethtown, Pennsylvania